Nicola Grimaldi  (1645–1717) was born at the Castello della Pietra, Naples,  a member of the noble Grimaldi family of Genoa.

Career
During the pontificate of Pope Innocent XI he became a governor of several cities in the Papal States. He was created a cardinal in the consistory of May 17, 1706, the same year in which he became the papal legate in Bologna. In 1716 he became Prefect of the Sacred Consulta  a position he held until his death.

Death
Grimaldi died at his palazzo in Rome on October 25, 1717, and was buried in the Capuchin Church of Santissima Concezione, Rome.

Notes and references

1645 births
1717 deaths
18th-century Italian cardinals
Nicola
Clergy from Naples